Eduard Duțu (born 18 April 2001) is a Romanian professional footballer who plays as a centre back for  club Gubbio, on loan from Fiorentina. He has dual Romanian-Italian citizenship.

Club career

Montevarchi
On 31 August 2021 he joined Montevarchi on loan. Eduard made his senior debut for Montevarchi on 12 September 2021, in a 0–1 away victory over Fermana counting for the Serie C.

On 22 July 2022 he joined Reggina on loan.

On 6 January 2023 he joined Gubbio on loan.

Career statistics

Club

References

External links

2001 births
Living people
Footballers from Rome
Italian people of Romanian descent
Italian footballers
Romanian footballers
Association football defenders
Serie C players
ACF Fiorentina players
Montevarchi Calcio Aquila 1902 players
Reggina 1914 players
A.S. Gubbio 1910 players
Romania youth international footballers